Fahid Mohammed Ally Msalam (also known as Usama al-Kini) (February 19, 1976 – January 1, 2009) was a Kenyan terrorist conspirator, wanted in the United States for his part in the 1998 United States embassy bombings in Kenya and Tanzania. He was born in Mombasa.

According to the indictment, Msalam
with Khalfan Khamis Mohamed, purchased the SUV used by the Tanzania cell
with Sheikh Ahmed Salim Swedan, purchased the Kenya bomb truck
helped to load the Tanzania bomb truck
fled Kenya to Karachi on the same airliner as Mohamed Odeh, on or about the day before the bombings.

Msalam was charged with 213 counts of murder, other counts which apply specifically to attacks against American federal personnel and facilities, counts of using weapons of mass destruction, and various conspiracy counts.

Msalam once worked as a clothing vendor. He also played midfield for a soccer team called the Black Panthers.

Msalam was on the FBI's list of Most Wanted Terrorists since its inception on October 10, 2001. The United States Department of State, through the Rewards for Justice Program, offered up to US$5,000,000 for information on the location of Fahid Mohammed Ally Msalam. He served as al-Qaeda's chief of operations for Pakistan.

On January 1, 2009, Msalam was killed in Pakistan in an American unmanned drone attack along with his lieutenant, Sheikh Ahmed Salim Swedan.

References

1976 births
2009 deaths
Assassinated al-Qaeda leaders
Deaths by United States drone strikes in Pakistan
Kenyan al-Qaeda members
Kenyan expatriates in Pakistan
People from Mombasa